Lucas Ezequiel Piovi (born 1 January 1992) is an Argentine professional footballer who plays as a defensive midfielder for LDU Quito.

Career
Piovi started his career in the youth system of Vélez Sarsfield, prior to departing in 2013. Piovi subsequently joined Lega Pro Seconda Divisione side Messina, making his bow in Italian football on 13 October 2013 against Foggia. He made two further appearances, versus Poggibonsi and Chieti, as Messina won their group. On 30 June 2014, Piovi completed a return to Argentina by agreeing to sign for General Lamadrid. Eleven appearances followed in Primera C Metropolitana. 2015 saw Piovi join Primera B Metropolitana's Fénix. He scored his first senior goal on 4 October 2015 in a win away to Almagro.

In June 2016, Piovi was loaned by the aforementioned Almagro; a team now in Primera B Nacional. He scored two goals in twenty-six matches in 2016–17, which led to the club signing Piovi permanently. His first appearance as a full-time Almagro player arrived versus Ferro Carril Oeste on 23 September 2017. On 14 June 2019, Piovi agreed loan terms with Primera División side Arsenal de Sarandí. One goal, in a 3–3 draw with River Plate, occurred across twenty appearances for Arsenal. In July 2020, Piovi headed abroad to join Ecuadorian Serie A team L.D.U. Quito.

His debut for the Quito club came on 22 August against Aucas, while September would see him appear in the Copa Libertadores for the first time; featuring in wins over Binacional (twice) and São Paulo.

Personal life
Piovi's brother, Gonzalo, is also a professional footballer.

Career statistics
.

References

External links

1992 births
Living people
Footballers from Buenos Aires
Argentine footballers
Association football midfielders
Argentine expatriate footballers
Expatriate footballers in Italy
Expatriate footballers in Ecuador
Argentine expatriate sportspeople in Italy
Argentine expatriate sportspeople in Ecuador
Serie C players
Primera C Metropolitana players
Primera B Metropolitana players
Primera Nacional players
Argentine Primera División players
Ecuadorian Serie A players
A.C.R. Messina players
General Lamadrid footballers
Club Atlético Fénix players
Club Almagro players
Arsenal de Sarandí footballers
L.D.U. Quito footballers